You Never Saw Such a Girl is a lost 1919 American silent drama film directed by Robert G. Vignola and written by Marion Fairfax and George Weston. The film stars Vivian Martin, Harrison Ford, Mayme Kelso, Willis Marks, Edna Mae Cooper, and John Burton. The film was released on February 16, 1919, by Paramount Pictures.

Plot

Cast
Vivian Martin as Marty McKenzie
Harrison Ford as Eric Burgess
Mayme Kelso as Fannie Perkins
Willis Marks as Uncle Esau
Edna Mae Cooper as Mrs. McKenzie
John Burton as Mr. Burgess
Edythe Chapman as Mrs. Burgess
Herbert Standing as Judge Eustace
Gerard Alexander as Mrs. Eustace
Claire Anderson as Katherine Spencer
Jim Farley as Reagan
J. Morris Foster as Gentleman Jack

References

External links

1919 films
1910s English-language films
Silent American drama films
1919 drama films
Paramount Pictures films
Films directed by Robert G. Vignola
American black-and-white films
Lost American films
American silent feature films
1919 lost films
Lost drama films
1910s American films